Volleyball at the 2020 Summer Paralympics took place at the Makuhari Messe in Tokyo, Japan. Two sitting volleyball team events were held, one for men and one for women.

The Tokyo Games were the fifth time the women's sitting volleyball event were contested. It was also the fifth Summer Paralympic Games without standing volleyball events, which had been included from the introduction of volleyball in 1976 through 2000.

The 2020 Summer Olympic and Paralympic Games were postponed to 2021 due to the COVID-19 pandemic. They kept the 2020 name and were held from 24 August to 5 September 2021.

Qualification
There were 16 teams (8 male, 8 female) which competed in the competition.

In 2016 in Rio the USA women won the event for the first time beating China in the final. Both of these teams qualified again to be joined by six other national teams.

Men

Women

Medalists

See also
Volleyball at the 2020 Summer Olympics

References

External links
Results book 

2020 Summer Paralympics events
Volleyball at the Summer Paralympics
International volleyball competitions hosted by Japan
Paralympics